Lokøy or Lokøyna is an island in Øygarden Municipality in Vestland county, Norway. It is located in a large archipelago and it sits just south of the island of Algrøyna, north of Syltøyna, and west of the large island of Sotra.

See also
List of islands of Norway

References

External links
Airplane photo of Lokøy 1961 
Airplane photo of Lokøy 1968

Islands of Vestland
Øygarden